Charlotte Supply Company Building was a historic warehouse building located at Charlotte, Mecklenburg County, North Carolina. It was built in 1924–1925, and was a four-story, brick building measuring 40 feet wide and 127 feet deep.  The building sat on a full basement and was designed by the architecture firm Lockwood, Greene and Company. It has been demolished

It was added to the National Register of Historic Places in 1984.

References

Commercial buildings on the National Register of Historic Places in North Carolina
Commercial buildings completed in 1925
Buildings and structures in Charlotte, North Carolina
National Register of Historic Places in Mecklenburg County, North Carolina